This article is the list of the Australian pianist Roger Woodward's, recordings and publications.

Principal first performances 
WP denotes world premiere
D denotes composer's dedication

Publications

Publications I: Original

Publications II: DVD performances

Publications III: Long play/vinyl and compact disc recordings

Charted recordings

References

Notes

Citations

Bibliography

Further reading

External links 
 
 

Classical music in Australia
Discographies of Australian artists
Discographies of classical composers
Discographies of classical compositions
Australian music-related lists
Lists of compositions by composer
Lists of songs recorded by Australian artists